Lithacoceras is an extinct ammonite cephalopod genus included in the superfamily Perisphinctoidea. These fast-moving nektonic carnivores lived during the Jurassic period, from the Oxfordian age to the Tithonian age.

Distribution
Fossils of species within this genus have been found in the Jurassic sediments of Antarctica, Argentina, Canada, Cuba, France, Germany, Madagascar, Somalia, Spain, United States and Yemen.

References

 Wojciech Brochwicz-Lewiński   Middle Oxfordian representatives of the genera Lithacoceras Hyatt, 1900, and Liosphinctes Buckman, 1925, from the Polish Jura Chain

Jurassic ammonites
Ammonites of North America
Ammonitida genera
Perisphinctoidea